Ric Waite (July 10, 1933 – February 18, 2012) was an American cinematographer whose numerous film and television credits included Red Dawn, Footloose, 48 Hrs., and The Long Riders. Waite received four Emmy nominations during his career. He won his only Emmy for his work on the 1976 television miniseries Captains and the Kings.

Biography

Early life and career
Waite was born in Sheboygan, Wisconsin. He enlisted in the United States Air Force after graduation from high school and was a member of the Air Force's Photo Intelligence unit. He moved to New York City, where he owned a studio as a professional photographer. Waite specialized in advertising and fashion photography. His clients included Jaguar Cars, Glamour, Vogue, Hanes, DuPont, and GQ.

Television
Waite moved to Los Angeles in 1970. His earliest work as a cinematographer was in television, including the 1970s television series Emergency!, City of Angels, and Police Story. He also shot many television films including Tail Gunner Joe in 1977, in which he earned an Emmy nomination; The Life and Assassination of the Kingfish, released in 1977, for which he received another Emmy nomination; Dead of Night and Amateur Night at the Dixie Bar and Grill, which aired in 1979. Waite earned his fourth and final Emmy nomination in 1996 for the television film Andersonville.

Film
Waite's feature film debut as a cinematographer was The Long Riders, a 1980 Western film directed by Walter Hill. His numerous film credits as director of photography included Footloose by Herbert Ross; Red Dawn by John Milius; Brewster's Millions, a 1985 film also by Hill; Summer Rental by director Carl Reiner; Volunteers by Nicholas Meyer; Cobra by George P. Cosmatos; and Adventures in Babysitting by Chris Columbus.

Later life
Waite moved to the Denver metropolitan area in 2002. He taught lighting and cinematography within the film studies department at the University of Colorado at Boulder.

Waite also shot Best Ribs in Town and Assassins' Code. He had signed on as the cinematographer for the film Legacy.

Waite died from a heart attack at his home in Los Angeles on February 18, 2012, at the age of 78. He was survived by his wife of 48 years, Judy, and two children, Richard and Burgandy.

References

External links

1933 births
2012 deaths
American cinematographers
Emmy Award winners
Film people from Los Angeles
Military personnel from Wisconsin
People from Denver
People from Sheboygan, Wisconsin
Photographers from New York City
United States Air Force airmen
University of Colorado Boulder faculty